Emergency Aviation in the United Kingdom may refer to:

 Air ambulances in the United Kingdom
 Police air support units; see Police aviation in the United Kingdom
 Search and rescue facilities provided by the Royal Air Force, the Royal Navy, or His Majesty's Coastguard